James Allen Wooldridge (born August 22, 1955) is an American former college basketball coach and athletics administrator.  Wooldridge was head coach at Central Missouri State, Texas State, Louisiana Tech, Kansas State, and UC Riverside. After his coaching career, Wooldridge served as athletic director at UC Riverside and Riverside City College.

Early life and education
Born and raised in Oklahoma City, Oklahoma, Wooldridge played on Putnam City High School's class 4A state basketball championship team in 1972. Playing at guard for the Louisiana Tech Bulldogs under head coach Emmett Hendricks from 1974 to 1977, Wooldridge was part of the Louisiana Tech team that won the 1976 Southland Conference regular season title. He earned his bachelor's degree in physical education from Louisiana Tech University in 1977 and master's degree in education from East Central University in 1979.

Coaching career

Early coaching career (1977–1985)
Wooldridge began his coaching career as a graduate assistant at Louisiana Tech in 1977–78 under new head coach J.D. Barnett. His first full time coaching job was at East Central, an NCAA Division II school where he was an assistant coach from 1978 to 1982. From 1982 to 1985, Wooldridge was an assistant coach at Central Missouri State (now Central Missouri) under Lynn Nance.

Central Missouri State (1985–1991)
In 1985, Wooldridge was promoted to head coach. In six seasons as head coach, Wooldridge went 130–49, with three consecutive NCAA tournament appearances from 1989 to 1991. The 1989–90 team went 27–6 for the second most wins in program history.

Southwest Texas State (1991–1994)
Wooldridge got his first NCAA Division I head coaching job at Southwest Texas State (now Texas State) in 1991. In three seasons, Texas State improved from 7–20 in 1991–92 to 25–7 with the Southland Conference men's basketball tournament title in 1993–94. As a result of winning the Southland Tournament, Southwest Texas State qualified for the NCAA tournament for the first time in program history. In three seasons, Wooldridge was 46–40 at Southwest Texas State.

Louisiana Tech head coach and NBA assistant (1994–2000)
In 1994, Wooldridge returned to his alma mater to be head coach at Louisiana Tech. After debuting with a 14–13 record, Wooldridge was less successful at Louisiana Tech than his previous two head coaching jobs. In four seasons, Wooldridge went 52–59. From 1998 to 2000, Wooldridge was an assistant coach for the Chicago Bulls of the NBA under former college teammate Tim Floyd.

Kansas State (2000–2006)
Wooldridge returned to college coaching in 2000 at Kansas State. In six seasons, Wooldridge went 83–90 at Kansas State. Although his last two teams had winning records, none of his teams had more than six wins in Big 12 Conference play or qualified for the NCAA Tournament or NIT. Kansas State fired Wooldridge on March 9, 2006; athletic director Tim Weiser said that an NCAA Tournament invitation was necessary for Wooldridge to keep his job.

Kansas State's 59-55 win at rival Kansas on January 14, 2006 was the only win in the Sunflower Showdown rivalry series during the Wooldridge era and Kansas State's most recent win at Allen Fieldhouse as of 2022.

UC Riverside (2007–2013)
From 2007 to 2013, Wooldridge was head coach at UC Riverside, where he went 70–112. In his second season, Wooldridge led UC Riverside to a 17–13 record in 2008–09, which would end up being his only winning season there. Wooldridge's college coaching career concluded in 2013 with a 381–350 record over 25 seasons at five programs.

Administrative career
After stepping down as head coach of UC Riverside basketball, Wooldridge was named interim athletic director at UC Riverside in July 2013 and later named Director of Intercollegiate Athletics in January 2014. After two years in this role, Wooldridge resigned in October 2014. In July 2015, Wooldridge was named interim athletic director at Riverside City College. In the summer of 2016, Wooldridge was elevated to the job long term. On March 30, 2020, Wooldridge announced that he would retire in July.

Head coaching record

References

1955 births
Living people
American men's basketball coaches
American men's basketball players
Basketball coaches from Oklahoma
Basketball players from Oklahoma
Central Missouri Mules basketball coaches
Chicago Bulls assistant coaches
College men's basketball head coaches in the United States
East Central Tigers men's basketball coaches
East Central University alumni
Kansas State Wildcats men's basketball coaches
Louisiana Tech Bulldogs basketball coaches
Louisiana Tech Bulldogs basketball players
Sportspeople from Oklahoma City
UC Riverside Highlanders athletic directors
UC Riverside Highlanders men's basketball coaches
Junior college athletic directors in the United States